Robert Dumitru Jerdea (born 28 September 2003) is a Romanian professional footballer who plays as a central midfielder for Liga III side CSM Alexandria.

Club career

Academica Clinceni
He made his league debut on 22 April 2021 in Liga I match against FCSB.

References

External links
 
 

2003 births
Living people
People from Drobeta-Turnu Severin
Romanian footballers
Association football midfielders
Liga I players
LPS HD Clinceni players
Liga II players
FC Unirea Constanța players
Liga III players